The 1961 Women's Amateur Snooker Championship was an amateur snooker tournament held in 1961. The event was held from 24 to 29 April 1961 at Burroughes Hall. Maureen Barrett, who had not participated in the tournament in the two previous years, won the event, defeating Thea March 4–1 in the final.

Main Draw

Final

References

1961 in snooker
Snooker amateur tournaments